Willungacetus is an extinct genus of primitive baleen whale of the family Aetiocetidae known from the Oligocene of Australia (at Port Willunga, paleocoordinates ). It is the oldest-known whale from Australia, and the only aetiocetid whale currently known from the Southern Hemisphere.

Neville S. Pledge first visited the type locality in 1983 and collected two boulders. These two rocks, however, were forgotten until 2001 when a partial vertebra were discovered within. The site was subsequently revisited and another specimen, a partial cranium, was discovered. Pledge referred a radius, collected from the same cliff in 1994, to his newly named species.

Pledge provisionally assigned Willungacetus to Aetiocetidae, but this assignment still needs to be confirmed.

Sister taxa
Aetiocetus
Ashorocetus
Chonecetus
Morawanocetus

References

Notes

Sources

 
 

Oligocene mammals of Australia
Oligocene cetaceans
Aetiocetidae
Prehistoric cetacean genera
Fossil taxa described in 2005